The Ogden Slip is a canal and harbor in Chicago, Illinois.

History

In 1861, Chicago Dock and Canal Company constructed the Odgen Slip. It was among many real estate investments of the company that were overseen by William B. Ogden. The slip was constructed with approval by the United States Department of War. The slip parallels the North Bank of the Chicago River, and was utilized as a harbor, and was home to warehouses well into the twentieth century.

By the 1960s, formal discussions were had by the Chicago Dock and Canal Company about redeveloping the real estate surrounding the slip.

By the mid-1980s, redevelopment around the slip was being formally planned. The Chicago Dock and Canal Trust was still controlled by William B. Ogden's descendants, and made their property in the area available for residential and commercial development as part of the planned Cityfront Center development. The abutting Pugh Terminal building (originally built between 1905 and 1920) was renovated into "North Pier", a retail complex.

Ogden Slip view corridor
The so-called "Ogden Slip view corridor" was created in the mid-1980s. When the redevelopment of the real estate near and surrounding the Ogden Slip was taking place, the city adopted a policy to preserve a view of the top of the Tribune Tower from Lake Shore Drive, through the slip. Such buildings as NBC Tower and Loews Hotel Tower have had their designs influenced by this policy.

See also
DuSable Park (Chicago)

References

Canals in Illinois
Ports and harbors of Illinois
Chicago